Miss World 1996, the 46th edition of the Miss World pageant, took place on 23 November 1996 in the city of Bangalore, India. Preliminaries were shot in India and in Seychelles. 88 contestants from all over the world took part in the prestigious pageant. By the end of the night, 18-year-old Irene Skliva of Greece took home the title. She was crowned by Jacqueline Aguilera of Venezuela.It was the first time the Miss World pageant was held in India.

Results

Placements

Continental Queens of Beauty

Contestants

Judges

 Andre Sekulic
 Linda Pétursdóttir – Miss World 1988 from Iceland
 Vijay Mallya
 Marlene Cardin
 Aamir Khan
 Aishwarya Rai – Miss World 1994 from India
 Sanath Jayasuriya
 Ninibeth Leal – Miss World 1991 from Venezuela
 Tom Nuyens – Mister World 1996 from Belgium
 Parmeshwar Godrej

Notes

Debuts

Returns

Last competed in 1970:
 
Last competed in 1991:
 
Last competed in 1993:
 
 
Last competed in 1994:

Withdrawals

  – Nicole Symonette could not compete due to financial problems with the Miss Bahamas Committee that ran Miss Bahamas for both Miss World and Miss Universe and thus was only able to send a representative to Miss Universe 1996.
  – Due to financial problems

Controversy
The event was organised by ABCL which was led by Amitabh Bachchan. The beauty pageant saw resistance by several groups due to the perceived culture clash. However, due to support of the local government, the event was held successfully.

References

External links
 Pageantopolis – Miss World 1996

Miss World
1996 in India
1996 beauty pageants
Beauty pageants in India
1990s in Bangalore
November 1996 events in Asia